The 135th Infantry Regiment is an infantry regiment in the Minnesota Army National Guard.

During the Civil War, the First Minnesota Regiment, today the 2nd Battalion, 135th Infantry Regiment (2/135) was the first volunteer regiment to offer its services to President Lincoln. The men of the 1st Minnesota are most remembered for their actions on the late afternoon of 2 July 1863, during the second day's fighting at Gettysburg, resulting in the prevention of a serious breach in the Union defensive line on Cemetery Ridge.

Lineage
1st Minnesota Volunteer Infantry organized 27 April 1861 at Fort Snelling. (Company A Pioneer Guards organized 17 April 1856 at St. Paul).
 Mustered into Federal service 29 April 1861 for 3 years service.
 Reorganized April 1864 as 1st Battalion Minnesota Volunteer infantry
 Expanded and redesignated 1st Regiment Minnesota Volunteer infantry 23 February 1865
 Mustered out of Federal service 14 July 1865 at Jeffersonville, Ind.
reorganized in 1870 from Regimental Veteran Association as 1st Regiment Minnesota Enrolled Militia
 Reorganized in 1880 as 1st Battalion Minnesota National Guard from the following Companies
 Company A. from Minneapolis Light infantry organized 1879,
 Company B. from Minneapolis Zouave Corps organized 1879,
 Company C. from St. Paul Guards organized 1879
 Company D. from Allen Light Guards organized 1879.
Expanded and redesignated in 1883 as 1st Infantry Regiment Minnesota National Guard.
 Redesignated 13th Infantry Regiment Minnesota Volunteers 4 May 1898 and mustered into Federal service at Camp Ramsey, Minn.
 Mustered out of Federal service 3 October 1899 at San Francisco.
 Reorganized as 1st infantry Regiment Minnesota National Guard 27 March 1900
 Mustered into Federal service 30 June 1916 at Fort Snelling, for Mexican Border.
 Mustered out 14 March 1917 at Fort Snelling
 Called into Federal service 25 March 1917 and mustered in on 26 March 1917, Drafted on 5 August 1917.
 Redesignated 135th Infantry Regiment 1 October 1917 and assigned to the 34th Division.
 Demobilized 18 February 1919 at Camp Grant (Illinois).
 Reorganized as 1st Regiment Minnesota National Guard 31 January 1920.
 Redesignated 135th Infantry Regiment, 34th Division, 21 November 1921.
 Inducted into Federal service 10 February 1941 at Minneapolis.
 Inactivated 3 November 1945 at Camp Patrick Henry, Va.
 Relieved from 34th Division and assigned to 47th Division 16 June 1946.
 Reorganized less former companies of 3rd Battalion, with headquarters at Mankato 23 September 1946
(3rd Battalion 135th Infantry hereafter separate lineage).
 ordered into active Federal service on 16 January 1951 at home stations. The 135th Infantry was organized and was Federally recognized on 16 January 1953 with headquarters at Mankato, Minnesota.
 released on 2 December 1954 from active Federal service and reverted to state control. Federal recognition was concurrently withdrawn from the 135th Infantry.
 reorganized on 22 February 1959 as a parent regiment under the Combat Arms Regimental System to consist of the 1st, 2nd, and 3rd Battle Groups, elements of the 47th Infantry Division.
 reorganized on 1 April 1963 to consist of the 1st, 2nd, 3rd, and 4th Battalions, elements of the 47th Infantry Division.
 1 February 1968 it was reorganized again to consist of the 1st and 2nd Battalions, elements of the 47th Infantry Division.
 withdrawn on 30 November 1988 from the Combat Arms Regimental System and reorganized under the United States Army Regimental System.
 1st and 2nd Battalions, 135th Infantry were relieved on 10 February 1991 from assignment to the 47th Infantry Division and assigned to the 34th Infantry Division.
 reorganized on 1 September 1992 to consist of the 2nd Battalion, an element of the 34th Infantry Division. and assigned to the 2nd Brigade, 34th Infantry Division as an air assault infantry battalion,
 reassigned to the 1st Brigade Combat Team, 34th Infantry Division.

Distinctive unit insignia
 Description
A Silver color metal and enamel device  in height overall consisting of a shield blazoned: Argent, on a saltire Azure between in chief a fleur-de-lis Gules, in fess the Corps badge of the 2d Division, 8th Army Corps during the Spanish War Proper (two Silver circles overlapping each other one-third radius, resembling the figure "8") fringed of the third and two bolos saltirewise and in base a bull's skull of the like, the 2d Division, 2d Corps badge of the Civil War of the fourth (a Silver three-leaf clover with stem, voided). Attached below and to the sides of the shield a Silver scroll inscribed "TO THE LAST MAN" in Blue letters.
 Symbolism
The shield is white (silver), the old Infantry colors.  The blue saltire is taken from the Confederate flag - for Civil War service.  At the battle of Gettysburg the 1st Minnesota Infantry Volunteers were in the 2d Division, 2d Corps (Hancock's), whose badge was the three-leaf clover.  The figure "8" represents the Spanish War service and the crossed bolos the Philippine Insurrection service, while the fleur-de-lis represents World War I service of the 135th Infantry.  The bull's skull (shoulder sleeve insignia of the 34th Division) indicates service with this Division during the period of peace and through World War II.
 Background
The distinctive unit insignia was approved for the 135th Infantry Regiment on 18 June 1926. It was amended to show additional war service on 19 December 1951.

Coat of arms
Blazon
 Shield: Argent, on a saltire Azure between in chief a fleur-de-lis Gules, in fess the Corps badge of the 2d Division, 8th Army Corps during the Spanish War Proper (two White circles overlapping each other one-third radius, resembling the figure "8") fringed of the third and two bolos saltirewise and in base a bull's skull of the like, the 2d Division, 2d Corps badge of the Civil War of the fourth (a White three-leaf clover with stem, voided).
Crest: That for the regiments and separate battalions of the Minnesota Army National Guard: On a wreath of the colors Argent and Azure, a sheaf of wheat Proper.
Motto: TO THE LAST MAN.
 Symbolism
Shield: The shield is white, the old Infantry colors. The blue saltire is taken from the Confederate flag - for Civil War service. At the battle of Gettysburg the 1st Minnesota Infantry Volunteers were in the 2d Division, 2d Corps (Hancock's), whose badge was the three-leaf clover. The figure "8" represents the Spanish War service and the crossed bolos the Philippine Insurrection service, while the fleur-de-lis represents World War I service of the 135th Infantry. The bull's skull (shoulder sleeve insignia of the 34th Division) indicates service with this Division during the period of peace and through World War II.
Crest: The crest is that of the Minnesota Army National Guard.
 Background: The coat of arms was approved on 23 June 1926. It was amended to show additional war service on 19 December 1951.

Campaign streamers

Decorations
 French Croix De Guerre with palm streamer embroidered BELVEDERE

References
 
 

 Historical register and dictionary of the United States Army, from ..., Volume 1 By Francis Bernard Heitman 
 Encyclopedia of United States Army insignia and uniforms By William K. Emerson (page 51).

External links
 http://www.history.army.mil/html/forcestruc/lh.html 

Military in Minnesota
135
135
Military units and formations established in 1861